Nikolay Dmitrievich Pilchikov (2 April 1857, Kharkov, Russian Empire (present-day Kharkiv, Ukraine) – 19 May 1908, Kharkov, Russian Empire) was a Ukrainian physicist, inventor, and geologist. He is known for the discovery of the photovoltaic effect, new properties of X-rays, and ways to control various mechanisms of the radio provided a basis of radio control.

Pilchikov discovered the phenomenon of electronic photography and determined its principles, conducted fundamental research of atmospheric ionisation and light polarisation, and designed many ingenious devices and appliances, many of which carry his name, including the prototype of the modern protective suit for astronauts.

Nikolay Pilchikov was also well-known as a researcher of the Kursk Magnetic Anomaly.

Nikolay Dmitrievich Pilchikov was a son of Dmitriy Pavlovich Pilchikov, one of members of the Brotherhood of Saints Cyril and Methodius. 

Pilchikov was a member of the Toulouse Academy of Sciences.

References

Physicists from the Russian Empire
Russian inventors
Ukrainian inventors
National University of Kharkiv alumni
1857 births
1908 deaths
Russian nobility
Scientists from Kharkiv
Digital photography
1908 suicides
19th-century Ukrainian physicists